Cheri Keaggy (born Cheri Louise Anderson; August 29, 1968) is a gospel singer and songwriter, with a musical style of Contemporary Christian music. She is now divorced from her high school sweetheart Eddie Keaggy, the nephew of the CCM pioneer artist, Phil Keaggy.

She was discovered by Charlie Peacock when Eddie, a sound engineer, did a concert for him. Peacock produced her first two albums, Child of the Father, and My Faith Will Stay.

Discography

Solo
1994: Child of the Father
1996: My Faith Will Stay 
1997: What Matters Most
2001: Let's Fly
2007: Because He First Loved Us
2012: So I Can Tell
2015: No Longer My Own

Other Albums
1999: There Is Joy in the Lord: The Worship Songs of Cheri Keaggy
2006: Very Best of Cheri Keaggy

With others
God With Us (Christmas) (1997)
Let Us Pray (National Day of Prayer) (1997)
Keep the Faith 2000: Overcoming Stress & Anxiety (1998)
If My People Pray (1999)
Revival Generation: Lovely Noise (1999)
Songs 4 Life: Strengthen Your Faith (1999)
Women of Faith: Overwhelming Joy (1999)
All We Faithful (Christmas) (2000)
I Will Be Here (wedding songs) (2002)

Songs
"Not With Jesus"
"My Faith Will Stay"
"Sweet Peace of God"
"In Remembrance of Me"
"You, Oh Lord, Are My Refuge"
"Little Boy on His Knees"
"Lay It Down"
"There Is Joy in the Lord"
"What Matters Most"

Awards
Dove Award Nominations: 
1995 New Artist of the Year
1997 Inspirational Album of the Year for My Faith Will Stay
1999 Praise & Worship Album of the Year for There Is Joy in the Lord

Dove Award Winner:
1998 Special Event Album of the Year for her contribution to God With Us

References

External links

Artist page on Jamline

American performers of Christian music
1968 births
Living people